This is a list of episodes for the ABC Family series Lincoln Heights. The series premiered on January 8, 2007 and ended on November 9, 2009, with a total of 43 episodes over the course of four seasons.

Series overview

Episodes

Season 1 (2007)

Season 2 (2007)

Season 3 (2008)

Season 4 (2009)

References

External links
 

Lists of American teen drama television series episodes